This is a list of Adenanthos species, subspecies and named hybrids. Taxa are listed in alphabetical order, and summary information is provided.  For the most recent taxonomic arrangement, see Nelson's taxonomic arrangement of Adenanthos.

Footnotes

References
 
 
 
 
 

List
Adenanthos
Adenanthos species, List of